Basrah International Airport  is the second largest international airport in Iraq, and is located in the southern city of Basra.

History

Construction
The airport was built in the 1980s and then developed in the 1980s by the Iraqi Government department State Organisation for Roads and Bridges (SORB) as a gateway to the only port in Iraq. This second phase of development was completed by a joint venture comprising Strabag Bau AG of Cologne, Billfinger & Berger of Manheim both in Germany and Universale of Austria in Spring 1988. It is claimed that the airport was built only as a facility for VIPs and was only used rarely.

Renovation and military use
Renovation of the airport was supposed to proceed with the construction of a new terminal under German contract but the project prematurely ceased with the outbreak of the 1991 Gulf War. Actual development proceeded in the airport only after the 2003 US invasion of Iraq. Some facilities were refurbished under a contract by United States Agency for International Development. The project is broad as it includes building air traffic control towers and other navigational facilities, as well as the construction of transportation and communications facilities.

The airport was eventually reopened in June 2004. The event was marked by the traditional sheep sacrifice as an Iraqi Airways Boeing 727 jet landed from Baghdad. It was the beginning of a new domestic service in Iraq between Baghdad and Basra. However, many of the passengers complained about the lack of basic facilities. Problems included air conditioning and toilets.

Reconstruction of the airport is still under way to improve the facilities. Iraqi Airways has already operated routes from this airport, and was its second hub.

Between 2003 and 2009 there was a significant Royal Air Force presence at the airport as No. 903 Expeditionary Air Wing was deployed here with a variety of fixed-wing and rotary such as:

Fixed-wing
 Hawker Siddeley Nimrod MR.2
 Lockheed Martin C-130J Super Hercules C.4 & C.5
 British Aerospace 125

Rotary
 Boeing Chinook HC.2
 Westland Sea King HC.4
 Westland Lynx AH.7/AH.9
 Westland Gazelle AH.1
 Westland Puma HC.1
 Westland Merlin HC.3

The unit was re-deployed to Camp Bastion, Afghanistan during mid 2009.

The United States Army has also deployed a number of aircraft to Basra irregularly:
 Boeing AH-64 Apache

The Danish Air Force also deployed some aircraft:
 Eurocopter Squirrel

Ground operations
Following the American control and since 2002, SkyLink Arabia has been providing ground operations and fuel supply at the airport. In 2014 Group holding services with its subsidiary Basra ground handling services company with the partnership of Iraq airways took over the ground handling operations at the airport.

During 2010 access to the airport was strictly controlled by checkpoints situated at the main Airport entrance. Navigating this was done strictly on the production of a flight reference number for outward travel. The US Government (USG), accommodated at the adjacent US Consulate, required dedicated transfer services from the Consulate to the Airport terminal. A newly established company, Personal Transition Services (PTS), was contracted by several of the USG elements to perform this service. The company started by providing services directly to and from the Airport, but quickly grew into a company that provide full life support services further to the south close to the Iraq/Kuwait border at Safwan. PTS became the first International company to have a desk inside the main Airport terminal, from where the locally employed staff were able to provide both English and Iraqi speaking services.

Airlines and destinations

See also
 List of United Kingdom Military installations used during Operation Telic
List of United States Military installations in Iraq

References

External links

Airports in Iraq
World War II airfields in Iraq
Airfields of the United States Army Air Forces Air Transport Command in the Middle East
1980s establishments in Iraq
Buildings and structures in Basra